The Kolaghat railway station in the Indian state of West Bengal, serves Kolaghat, India in Purba Medinipur district. It is on the Howrah–Kharagpur line.

History

The Howrah–Kharagpur line was opened in 1900.

Tracks
The Howrah–Panskura stretch has three lines. Platform No 1 and 2 are attached but Platform No 3 is detached from the other two Platforms. Usually down trains (towards Howrah) are available on Platform no 1. Up trains (towards Kharagpur, Medinipur) are available on platform no 2 & 3. To reaching both platforms (1 & 2,3) one have to climb a hill like slope. The distance between two platforms are more than 150 meter and the slope is more than 15 meter high from the Kolaghat locality.

Electrification
The Howrah–Kharagpur line was electrified in 1967–69.

References

External links
Trains at Kolaghat

Railway stations in Purba Medinipur district
Kolkata Suburban Railway stations